Movimiento Nacional Socialista de Chile was a political movement in Chile, during the Presidential Republic Era, which initially supported the ideas of Adolf Hitler, although it later moved towards a more local form of fascism. They were commonly known as Nacistas.

Development
The movement was formed in April 1932 by General Diaz Valderrama, Carlos Keller (the main ideologue of the group) and Jorge González von Marées, who became leader. The party initially followed the ideas of Nazism closely, stressing anti-Semitism. It received financial support from the German population of Chile and soon built up a membership of 20,000 people. The movement stressed what it saw as the need for one party rule, corporatism and solidarity between classes, and soon set up its own paramilitary wing, the Tropas Nacistas de Asalto.

However support for Hitler was later abandoned, with González von Marées claiming by the late 1930s that the use of the name 'national socialist' had been an error on his part. Anti-semitism was also scaled back, with a more domestic form of fascism being offered instead. Indeed, the main ideological inspiration claimed by the group was Diego Portales and the choice of name had to an extent been inspired by the success the Nazis were enjoying in Europe and a desire to tap into their, at the time, high reputation. Initial contact with the NSDAP/AO eventually ended when that group criticised the Nacistas for their lack of commitment to anti-Semitism. Individual members (most notably, Miguel Serrano) continued to look to Adolf Hitler.

Mergers
The party obtained three deputies (3,5% of the votes) during the 1937 parliamentary elections. It then merged in 1938 with the Unión Socialista (Socialist Union) to create the Alianza Popular Libertadora (APL) which supported General Carlos Ibáñez del Campo's candidacy for the 1938 presidential election. However, fascist elements attempted a coup in September 1938, which was ruthlessly put down at the Seguro Obrero massacre, and led Ibáñez to oppose the National Socialists' choice of Gustavo Ross, leading to indirect support of the Radical Party's candidate, Pedro Aguirre Cerda, who narrowly won the election.

In 1939, some members of the APL created an offshoot, the fascist Vanguardia Popular Socialista, which failed to have any impact, and it was disbanded in 1941 whilst González von Marées was interned. On the other hand, the APL merged in 1945 with the Agrarian Party to form the Partido Agrario Laborista (PAL).

Of the former members of the party only Jorge Prat gained much influence. Publishing a weekly paper, Estanquero, between 1949 and 1954, he served as a cabinet minister in Carlos Ibáñez del Campo's government and attempted to run for President of Chile in 1964.

See also
Nazism in Chile
Presidential Republic (1925–1973)

References

Antisemitism in Chile
German-Chilean culture
Nazi parties
Nazis in South America
Political parties established in 1932
Fascist parties in Chile
Defunct political parties in Chile
Presidential Republic (1925–1973)
Political parties disestablished in 1938
1932 establishments in Chile
1938 disestablishments in Chile